Ulopeza alenialis is a moth in the family Crambidae. It was described by Strand in 1913. It is found in Cameroon, the Democratic Republic of Congo and Equatorial Guinea.

References

Moths described in 1913
Spilomelinae